March of the Soviet Tankmen is a 1939 military march composed by the Pokrass brothers and with lyrics by  (Борис Савельевич Ласкин), whose debut was in the 1939 movie Tractor Drivers, in which the role of Klim Yarko is played by Nikolai Kryuchkov. Later the song was used in World War II short titled "Fascist Jackboots Shall Not Trample Our Motherland" by Ivanov-Vano (1941). Valery Dunaevsky commented that the song "was full of fighting spirit" in his book A Daughter of the "Enemy of the People" (2015).

Lyrics

See also 
 Soviet Tankmen's Song

References

Russian military marches
1939 songs
Songs written for films
Russian patriotic songs
Russian military songs
Soviet songs
Tanks
Songs about Russia
Songs of World War II